A. maculata may refer to:

 Acmadenia maculata, a flowering plant
 Acrolophus maculata, a Brazilian moth
 Actinacantha maculata, an orb-weaver spider
 Actodromas maculata, a migratory wader
 Acus maculata, an auger snail
 Aechmea maculata, an evergreen plant
 Aemene maculata, an Asian moth
 Aerides maculata, a cat's-tail orchid
 Afroneta maculata, a sheet weaver
 Agathiopsis maculata, an emerald moth
 Agroeca maculata, a liocranid sac spider
 Aguaytiella maculata, a neotropical harvestman
 Alaena maculata, a Congolese butterfly
 Alcis maculata, a geometer moth
 Alloclemensia maculata, a Japanese moth
 Allothereua maculata, an Australian centipede
 Allotoca maculata, a fish endemic to Mexico
 Aloe maculata, a succulent plant
 Alpinia maculata, a flowering plant
 Amblyeleotris maculata, a benthic goby
 Ameerega maculata, a poison dart frog
 Amoria maculata, a sea snail
 Amphiura maculata, a brittle star
 Aname maculata, a spider endemic to Australia
 Anaspis maculata, a false flower beetle
 Anchiale maculata, a stick insect
 Anguis maculata, a snake endemic to Sri Lanka
 Antona maculata, a South American moth
 Anyphaena maculata, an anyphaenid sac spider
 Apis maculata, a leaf-cutter bee
 Aplysia maculata, a sea hare
 Aranea maculata, a golden orb-web spider
 Aratinga maculata, a South American parrot
 Arca maculata, an ark clam
 Architectonica maculata, a staircase shell
 Arctia maculata, a European moth
 Arctosa maculata, a wolf spider
 Armina maculata, a sea slug
 Ashtoret maculata, a moon crab
 Australothele maculata, a funnel-web spider
 Austrobaileya maculata, a plant endemic to Queensland